The Ruthiyai-Maksi section of the West Central Railway Zone is a fully operational public transit system in the state of Madhya Pradesh. It connects Ruthiyai Jn with Maksi Jn. The section forms a part of the Indore-Gwalior line which connects two important cities, Indore & Gwalior with each other.

The rail section also connects Shajapur, Biaora Rajgarh and Chachaura Binaganj stations along the way. The section connects Gwalior city directly with Guna, Ujjain, Ratlam, Kota, Indore, Bhopal, Dewas & Nagda.

Developments 
For a long time, a demand of doubling of the rail section is being raised by the people of the region via their elected representatives in the parliament. However, the demands are yet to be met with a positive response from the Indian Railways.

See also
 West Central Railway
 Indore Junction railway station
 Dewas Junction railway station
 Ujjain Junction railway station
 Guna Junction railway station

References

Rail transport in Madhya Pradesh